The drylands vesper mouse (Calomys musculinus) is a species of rodent in the family Cricetidae.
It is found in Argentina, Bolivia and Paraguay.

References

 Baillie, J. 1996.  Calomys musculinus.   2006 IUCN Red List of Threatened Species.   Downloaded on 9 July 2007.
Musser, G. G. and M. D. Carleton. 2005. Superfamily Muroidea. pp. 894–1531 in Mammal Species of the World a Taxonomic and Geographic Reference. D. E. Wilson and D. M. Reeder eds. Johns Hopkins University Press, Baltimore.

Calomys
Mammals of Argentina
Mammals of Bolivia
Mammals of Paraguay
Mammals described in 1913
Taxa named by Oldfield Thomas
Taxonomy articles created by Polbot